Atari, Inc. was an American video game developer and video game console and home computer development company which operated between 1972 and 1984. During its years of operation, it developed and produced over 350 arcade, console, and computer games for its own systems, and almost 100 ports of games for home computers such as the Commodore 64. Atari began its operations by developing and producing some of the first arcade video games; the first commercial arcade video game, Computer Space, was released in November 1971 by Atari founders Nolan Bushnell and Ted Dabney in partnership as Syzygy Engineering. The game in part marked the end of the early history of video games and the start of the rise of the commercial video game industry. After its founding in 1972, Atari released Pong, believed to be the third arcade video game after Computer Space and a clone game and the first commercially successful arcade video game machine, and thereafter produced numerous arcade games, including video games and pinball machines.

The arcade game market is split into manufacturers, distributors, and operators; manufacturers like Atari sell game machines to distributors—who handle several types of electronic machines—who in turn sell them to the operators of locations. In the early 1970s, distributors bought games on an exclusive basis, meaning that only one distributor in each distribution region would carry products from a given arcade game manufacturer, restricting the manufacturer to only the operators that distributor sold to. In 1973 Atari set up a secret subsidiary company, Kee Games, which was intended to sell clones of Atari's games in order to reach more distributors; Kee was merged with Atari the following year. Atari itself was sold to Warner Communications in 1976, and merged with its WCI Games division, keeping the name Atari, Inc.

In 1975 Atari released Home Pong, its first of several Pong-based dedicated video game consoles, and in 1977 released its first home video game console, the Atari Video Computer System (later renamed the Atari 2600). From that point onward Atari developed both arcade games and console games, and in 1979 added games for their first home computers, the Atari 400 and 800. Atari produced a second home video game console in 1982, the Atari 5200, and four more home computer versions. Beginning in Summer 1981, Atari published the Atari Program Exchange, a quarterly mail-order catalog of software written for Atari computers by external developers which Atari then distributed to customers. In May 1983, Atari started the Atarisoft division, which produced ports of games by Atari and others for non-Atari home computers. In July 1984, as a result of falling sales due to the video game crash of 1983, Atari, Inc. was split apart by Warner Communications; the arcade division continued as a subsidiary of Warner under the name Atari Games, while the console and computer games divisions were sold off as Atari Corporation.

Games
Atari's dedicated consoles and many of their early console games were licensed for sale through Sears, which often sold them under a different name, on some occasions months prior to the Atari-branded version. When different, these variant names are listed in the table below. When the same arcade game was released with minor variations by Atari and Kee Games, the two games are listed together.

See also
 List of Atari 2600 games
 List of Atari 5200 games

Notes

References

Sources

 

Atari, Inc.